Spy Schools: How the CIA, FBI and Foreign Intelligence Secretly Exploit America’s Universities is a 2017 book by Daniel Golden, published by Henry Holt and Company. It describes relations between American tertiary institutions and the U.S. intelligence community.

Background
Golden stated that he was inspired to write this book after he learned of how the FBI tried to persuade a Chinese-American academic to do espionage against China, and how he learned such situations were more common than Golden realized.

Content
The book examines particular instances of spying in the initial section and on foreign intelligence agencies intervention in tertiary institutions and their students from outside of the United States in the second part. Operations by both the Central Intelligence Agency (CIA) and the Federal Bureau of Investigation (FBI) are documented in this book. The book also includes the Glenn Duffie Shriver case.

Reception
Ed J. Hagerty of American Public University System criticized the "overall quality of the research" as the book mainly used popular journalism and other sources that the public could access as its primary sources, but praised the interview material that Hagerty stated "elevates the book to a higher level".

Kirkus Reviews described the book as "provocative".

See also
 The Price of Admission - Another book by Golden

References

Notes

External links
 Spy Schools - Macmillan Publishers

2017 non-fiction books
Books about the United States
Henry Holt and Company books